SriLankan Airlines is the flag carrier of Sri Lanka. Launched in 1979, the airline's hub is located at Bandaranaike International Airport in Colombo, providing connections to its global route network of 96 destinations in 46 countries (including codeshare operations along with its partner OneWorld airlines). The following is a list of destinations served by SriLankan Airlines, as of May 2017. The list includes the city and country name, the airport codes of the International Air Transport Association (IATA airport code) and the International Civil Aviation Organization (ICAO airport code), and the airport name.

In the past, SriLankan Airlines used to fly from Colombo to London Gatwick, Amsterdam, Vienna and Zurich.

List

See also
SriLankan AirTaxi
Cinnamon Air

References

External links
 

SriLankan Airlines
Lists of airline destinations
Oneworld destinations
Sri Lanka transport-related lists